Billy: The Early Years is the official movie soundtrack for the film of the same name. It was released October 7, 2008, and charted at No. 70 on the U.S. Top Country Albums chart. The album has produced two chart singles; "Low" by Sara Evans and "Over the Next Hill" by Brooks & Dunn. Additionally, the song "Look At Me" was covered by Carrie Underwood for her third studio album, Play On, which was released on November 3, 2009.

Singles
"Low" (by Sara Evans) was chosen as the leading song for the soundtrack, and was released on September 29, 2008. In October it debuted at No. 59 on the Hot Country Songs chart, but fell off the next week. The song then re-entered on the chart dated for January 24, 2009. A music video was made for the single, which features Sara Evans performing inside of a church and next to a log house with scenes from the movie intertwined with them. 

In late 2009, "Over the Next Hill" by Brooks & Dunn debuted at No. 60 on the Hot Country Songs chart for the week of November 28, 2009. The song also features vocals from Mac Powell of the Christian rock band Third Day

Track listing
"Over the Next Hill" by Brooks & Dunn with Mac Powell (of Third Day) - 3:08
"Low" by Sara Evans - 3:12
"Look at Me" by Alan Jackson - 3:15
"Shelter Me" by China Edelman - 2:45
"Ruth's Prayer" by Patty Griffin - 3:48
"Heavenly Day" by Brandon Heath - 3:34
"The Great Wild Beyond" by Gregory Page - 3:50
"Amazing Love" by Michael W. Smith and Melinda Doolittle - 3:21
"In Dreams" by Roy Orbison - 2:49
"What a Friend We Have in Jesus" by Brad Paisley - 2:27
"Almost Persuaded" by Josh Turner - 2:13
"Just As I Am" by Sierra Hull and All-Star Choir - 2:19

Charts

Album

Singles

Awards 

In 2009, the album was nominated for a Dove Award for Special Event Album of the Year at the 40th GMA Dove Awards.

References 

Biographical film soundtracks
2008 soundtrack albums
Arista Records soundtracks